Operation Branchform is a Police Scotland investigation into possible fundraising fraud in the Scottish National Party. The investigation was launched in July 2021 following seven complaints.

The investigation is over whether £666,953 raised for a Scottish independence campaign were in part improperly spent by the SNP on other activities. The SNP denies any wrongdoing. The police have also been asked to look at a loan of £107,620 made in June 2021 by Peter Murrell, the SNP's chief executive at the time and husband to Nicola Sturgeon, the SNP's party leader and First Minister of Scotland, after a party meeting discussed the funding being looked at by the police. The loan was reported late to the Electoral Commission. There have been calls for Murrell to stand down because of the investigation.

In February 2023, it was reported that the police plan to speak to key witnesses within the party.

References

2021 scandals
2021 in British politics
2022 scandals
2022 in British politics
2023 scandals
2023 in British politics
Scottish National Party